Pterocalla pentophthalma is a species of ulidiid or picture-winged fly in the genus Pterocalla of the family Ulidiidae.

References

pentophthalma
Insects described in 1914